Taeniorhachis is a genus of plants in the grass family. The only known species is Taeniorhachis repens, native to Somalia.

References

Panicoideae
Endemic flora of Somalia
Monotypic Poaceae genera